Kim Dae-Eui (born 30 May 1974) is a South Korean football player who plays for Home United FC as a winger and attacker.

He started his career as a professional footballer at Seongnam Ilhwa Chunma. In Seongnam, he won the MVP award of the K-League's 2002 season. Before he joined Seongnam, he was a member of Korea U-20 team in 1992 and Universiade team in 1997.

In 2004, he joined another Korean club side Suwon Samsung Bluewings and helped the team to become the Korean champions in the same year.

He is member of 30–30 Club since 16 June 2007.

He is a close friend with fellow footballer Choi Sung-Yong, who played with him in the national team and at the Bluewings.

Club statistics

National team statistics

International goals
Results list South Korea's goal tally first.

References

External links
 
 National Team Player Record 
 
 

1974 births
Living people
Association football wingers
JEF United Chiba players
Seongnam FC players
Suwon Samsung Bluewings players
Home United FC players
J1 League players
K League 1 players
Singapore Premier League players
K League 1 Most Valuable Player Award winners
South Korean footballers
South Korean expatriate footballers
South Korea international footballers
Expatriate footballers in Japan
South Korean expatriate sportspeople in Japan
Expatriate footballers in Singapore
South Korean expatriate sportspeople in Singapore
People from Suwon
Korea University alumni
Sportspeople from Gyeonggi Province